Francis Levy (born March 28, 1948) is the author of the comic novels Erotomania: A Romance, published by Two Dollar Radio in 2008 and subsequently translated in a Spanish edition by  in 2009, and Seven Days in Rio, published by Two Dollar Radio in 2011. Levy is also the co-founder of the Philoctetes Center for the Multidisciplinary Study of Imagination.  He has been profiled in The East Hampton Star, AIGA Voice, Nerve.com, and elsewhere.

Writing
Levy's debut novel, Erotomania: A Romance, a satirical examination of compulsive sexuality, was a Queerty Top 10 Book of 2008 and named a Standout Book of the Year by Inland Empire Weekly. Erotomania was reviewed in The Village Voice, The Los Angeles Times, Publishers Weekly, Time Out Chicago and elsewhere.  Levy's short stories, poems, criticism, and essays have appeared in The New York Times, The Washington Post, The New Republic, The Village Voice, The East Hampton Star, The Quarterly, and Evergreen Review. The journal American Imago published a long autobiographical essay about Levy's psychoanalytic treatment entitled "Psychoanalysis: The Patient’s Cure” in its Spring 2010 issue.  Levy blogs as The Screaming Pope.

The Philoctetes Center
Inspired by CP Snow's famed "Two Cultures" essay, The Philoctetes Center (2003–2011) brought together scientists, artists, and scholars in an attempt to bridge the separation between the worlds of science and the humanities. In doing so, the Center hosted a range of figures from the humanities, including Edward Albee, John Turturro, Nicholson Baker, John Cameron Mitchell, Rick Moody, Ned Rorem, Rocco Landesman, C.K. Williams, Sharon Olds, Kiki Smith, Bruce McCall, Lewis Black, Philip Pearlstein, and Chuck Close, together with such distinguished scientists as physicist Brian Greene, Nobel prize-winning researchers Gerald Edelman and Christian De Duve, and neuroscientists Antonio Damasio and Joseph LeDoux, among others.

Education
Levy received a BA from Columbia University in 1969 and an M.F.A from the Yale School of Drama in 1973. He also holds a third-degree black belt from Seido Karate, and was the subject of a profile concerning his workout regimen in the online edition of The Wall Street Journal.

References

External links

 Seven Days in Rio Review by Jessica Maybury, nthWORD Shorts, January 2012
 "Seven Days in Rio" Review by David Cooper in New York Journal of Books, June 2011
 The Philoctetes Center for the Multidisciplinary Study of Imagination

21st-century American novelists
American male novelists
1948 births
Living people
Yale School of Drama alumni
Columbia College (New York) alumni
Novelists from New York (state)
Jewish American novelists
21st-century American male writers
21st-century American Jews